Stine Andersen may refer to:

 Stine Andersen (sport shooter) (born 1985), Danish sport shooter
 Stine Andersen (handballer) (born 1993), Danish handball player